Karen Smith (born 30 January 1979 in Toowoomba, Queensland) is a former field hockey midfield player from Australia. After her stint in hockey she went on to become a P.E. teacher for 4yrs at Clairvaux MacKillop College. She is married with two children and resides in Toowoomba

International senior competitions
 1997 – Champions Trophy, Berlin, Germany (1st)
 1998 – World Cup, Utrecht, Netherlands (1st)
 1999 – Champions Trophy, Brisbane, Australia (1st)
 2000 – Champions Trophy, Amstelveen, Netherlands (3rd)
 2001 – Champions Trophy, Amstelveen, Netherlands (3rd)
 2002 – Commonwealth Games, Manchester, United Kingdom (3rd)
 2002 – Champions Trophy, Macau, China (4th)
 2002 – World Cup, Perth, Australia (4th)
 2003 – Champions Trophy, Sydney, Australia (1st)
 2004 – Summer Olympics, Athens, Greece (5th)
 2004 – Champions Trophy, Rosario, Argentina (4th)
 2005 – Champions Trophy, Canberra, Australia (2nd)
 2006 – Commonwealth Games, Melbourne, Australia (1st)
 2006 – Champions Trophy, Amstelveen, Netherlands (5th)
 2006 – World Cup, Madrid, Spain (2nd)

References
 Profile on Hockey Australia

External links
 

1979 births
Living people
Australian female field hockey players
Field hockey players at the 2004 Summer Olympics
Olympic field hockey players of Australia
Commonwealth Games gold medallists for Australia
Commonwealth Games bronze medallists for Australia
Field hockey players at the 2002 Commonwealth Games
Field hockey players at the 2006 Commonwealth Games
Sportspeople from Toowoomba
Commonwealth Games medallists in field hockey
21st-century Australian women
Medallists at the 2002 Commonwealth Games
Medallists at the 2006 Commonwealth Games